"Counting Blue Cars (Tell Me Your Thoughts on God)" is a song by American alternative rock band Dishwalla from their 1995 A&M Records album Pet Your Friends. It is their only hit song, peaking at number 15 on the Billboard Hot 100 and topping the same magazine's Modern Rock Tracks chart in 1996. It received two ASCAP awards (1997 and 1998) as the most played song of the year on radio in the United States.

Writing and inspiration
Dishwalla lead singer J. R. Richards wrote 'Counting Blue Cars' "rather quickly", telling the "story of a young boy's spiritual journey". He said the lyrics are about a conversation with the child within himself, but was inspired by an actual chat with his 10-year-old neighbor. Richards said:

As quoted, Richards received death threats after the single's release from listeners who were upset about God's depiction as a female in the song.

Chart performance
"Counting Blue Cars" was highly popular on the radio, peaking at number four on pop airplay and number five on Hot AC airplay in 1996. It became a number-one Modern Rock Track for one week in June 1996 and a number two Mainstream Rock Track. It peaked at number 15 on the Billboard Hot 100 and showed longevity by remaining on the chart for nearly a year at 48 weeks. In March 2022, the song received a gold certification from the Recording Industry Association of America (RIAA) for digital sales and streams of over 500,000 units.

Track listings and formats

 US CD and cassette
 "Counting Blue Cars" (LP Version) – 4:51
 "The Other Side of the World"  – 3:46

 European CD and UK 7-inch vinyl
 "Counting Blue Cars" (Edit) – 4:20
 "Counting Blue Cars" (Acoustic Live Edit) – 4:32

 US and European maxi
 "Counting Blue Cars" (Edit) – 4:20
 "Until I Wake Up"  – 4:42
 "Counting Blue Cars" (Acoustic Live Edit) – 4:32
 "Date with Sarah" (Instrumental) – 3:51

 US CD 1 and German maxi
 "Counting Blue Cars (Tell Me All Your Thoughts on God)" (Edit) – 4:20
 "Until I Wake Up"  – 4:42
 "Sarah Without Sarah" (Acoustic) – 3:51
 "Counting Blue Cars (Tell Me All Your Thoughts on God)" (LP Version) – 4:51

 US CD 2
 "Counting Blue Cars" (LP Version) – 4:51
 "The Other Side of the World"  – 3:46
 "Counting Blue Cars" (Acoustic) – 5:39
 "Until I Wake Up"  – 4:42

 Japanese EP
 "Counting Blue Cars"  – 4:20
 "Until I Wake Up"  – 4:42
 "It's Going to Take Some Time"  – 4:42
 "Date with Sarah"  – 3:51
 "Charlie Brown's Parents"  – 4:51
 "The Other Side of the World"  – 3:51
 "The Feeder"  – 4:51
 "Counting Blue Cars" (Acoustic) – 4:20

Charts

Weekly charts

Year-end charts

Certifications

Release history

References

External links
 

1995 songs
1996 singles
Dishwalla songs
A&M Records singles